The Silent Bells is the fourth and final installment in N. D. Wilson's young adult fantasy series Ashtown Burials. Whereas the first three novels were published by Random House, The Silent Bells is being self-published in serial format. The first installment was written in 2020 and the total number of installments is currently unknown.

References

Novels by N. D. Wilson
American young adult novels
American fantasy novels
Young adult fantasy novels
Novels first published in serial form